The 2017 MTV Movie & TV Awards was held on May 7, 2017, from the Shrine Auditorium in Los Angeles, California, U.S. It was the 26th edition of the awards, and for the first time it presented honors for work in television as well as cinema; it was also the first time men and women competed jointly in the acting categories since 2007. The awards ceremony was hosted by Adam DeVine and broadcast on numerous Viacom channels, MTV.com, and the MTV app on mobile devices.

The ceremony was preceded by the "Movie & Television Festival". It was a day-long event that was held outside the Shrine Auditorium and featured live performances by Bea Miller, All Time Low, and Zara Larsson; plus red carpet appearances by celebrities. Issa Rae served as the announcer for the event.

Performers

Festival
All Time Low - "Dirty Laundry"/"Weightless"
Zara Larsson - "Don't Let Me Be Yours"/"Shape of You"
Bea Miller - "I Can't Breathe"

Show
Adam DeVine, Millie Bobby Brown, Lil Rel Howery, Blake Anderson, Chrissy Metz, DJ Nasty, Josh Gad, Mike Colter, Hailee Steinfeld, and Rebel Wilson – "Movies & TV" / "Be His Guest" / "Logan" / "Movies & TV (Reprise)" Medley (parody of the Beauty and the Beast songs)
Noah Cyrus - "Stay Together"
Pitbull and J Balvin ft. Camila Cabello - "Hey Ma"
Big Sean - "Jump Out the Window"

House DJ
DJ Nasty

Presenters
Asia Kate Dillon – presented Best Actor in a Movie
Zac Efron and Alexandra Daddario – presented Best Actor in a Show
DJ Khaled – introduced DJ Nasty
Tom Holland and Zendaya – presented sneak peek to Spider-Man: Homecoming
Milo Ventimiglia and Chrissy Metz – presented Best Duo
Yara Shahidi and Shay Mitchell – introduced Noah Cyrus
Allison Williams and Lil Rel Howery – presented Best Kiss
Tracee Ellis Ross and Maxine Waters – presented Best Fight Against the System
Gal Gadot – presented Generation Award, and introduced Pitbull, J Balvin, and Camila Cabello
John Cena and Aaron Taylor-Johnson – presented Next Generation
Jaeden Lieberher, Jeremy Ray Taylor, Sophia Lillis, Finn Wolfhard, Wyatt Oleff, Chosen Jacobs, and Jack Dylan Grazer – presented exclusive trailer to It
Ansel Elgort and Hailee Steinfeld – presented Tear Jerker
Martha Stewart and Snoop Dogg – presented Best Host
Dane DeHaan and Cara Delevingne – introduced Big Sean
Terrence J – presented Best Musical Performance (commercial break)
Adam DeVine – presented Best Reality Competition and Best Comedic Performance
Goldie Hawn and Amy Schumer – presented Movie of the Year
Mark Wahlberg – presented exclusive clip from Transformers: The Last Knight
Cast of 13 Reasons Why – presented Show of the Year(Dylan Minnette, Katherine Langford, Alisha Boe, Brandon Flynn, Justin Prentice, Miles Heizer, Ross Butler, Devin Druid, Brandon Larracuente, Ajiona Alexus, Michele Selene Ang, Tommy Dorfman, and Steven Silver)

Winners and nominees
The full list of nominees was announced on April 6, 2017.

MTV Generation Award
Fast & Furious franchise

Multiple nominations
Film
The following movies received multiple nominations:
Seven – Get Out
Five – Beauty and the Beast
Three – Hidden Figures, Logan, Moonlight, Rogue One: A Star Wars Story
Two – The Edge of Seventeen, La La Land

Television
The following television series received multiple nominations:
Four – Stranger Things
Three – Atlanta, Game of Thrones, This Is Us
Two – Black-ish, Insecure, Jane the Virgin, Luke Cage, RuPaul's Drag Race, The Voice, The Walking Dead

References

External links
 MTV Movie & TV Awards official site

MTV Movie and TV Awards
MTV Movie and TV Awards
2017 in Los Angeles
2017 in American cinema
MTV Movie and TV Awards
MTV Movie & TV Awards